Marco Paulo da Silva Soares (born 16 June 1984) is a professional footballer who plays for Portuguese club Florgrade FC as a defensive midfielder.

He spent most of his career in Portugal and Cyprus, making 60 Primeira Liga appearances for União de Leiria, Feirense and Arouca in the former and representing Omonia and AEL Limassol in the latter's First Division.

Soares earned 52 caps for Cape Verde from 2006, playing at the 2013 and 2021 Africa Cup of Nations.

Club career
Born in Setúbal, Portugal, Soares started playing professionally with F.C. Barreirense, competing two seasons in the third division and one in the second. In 2006 he signed for U.D. Leiria, but only totalled two Primeira Liga appearances in his first two years, also serving two loans in the process, one of them in Romania with CS Pandurii Târgu Jiu.

Soares returned to Leiria for the 2008–09 campaign, helping União be promoted to the top flight after a one-year absence. Eventually, he would also become club captain.

On 31 October 2010, during a 1–2 home loss against Sporting CP – where he had played youth football – Soares fractured his left leg while attempting a shot, being sidelined for four months. After returning, he contributed 14 matches in 2011–12 as his team suffered relegation.

After a spell with AC Omonia in Cyprus, where he won the Super Cup in 2012, Soares signed a two-year deal with C.D. Primeiro de Agosto of the Angolan Girabola in November 2013. The team was managed by Daúto Faquirá, who had given him his debut at Barreirense.

In July 2015, Soares returned to the Eastern Mediterranean island to join AEL Limassol. As before, he won the Super Cup in his first summer at the club, this time beating APOEL FC in a penalty shootout.

Soares came back to Portugal after six years away in July 2018, signing a two-year contract for C.D. Feirense. In September the following year, after relegation from the top flight, he rescinded his link and moved to F.C. Arouca in the third tier. The 35-year-old extended his contract in May 2020, when a COVID-19-ended season resulted in promotion.

International career
Soares opted to represent Cape Verde internationally. He made his debut on 27 May 2006 in a friendly against Portugal, playing the last five minutes of a 4–1 loss as a substitute for Emerson da Luz. On 2 June 2007, he scored his first goal in a 2–2 home draw with Algeria in 2008 Africa Cup of Nations qualification. He was a member of the squad in the 2010 FIFA World Cup qualification campaign, scoring to conclude a 3–1 win over Mauritius also in Praia.

On 24 May 2010, Soares appeared in a friendly in Covilhã against the country of his birth, who were preparing for the World Cup in South Africa, playing the entire match as the minnows (ranked 117th) managed a 0–0 draw. He was part of Cape Verde's first major tournament squad at the 2013 Africa Cup of Nations, where the Blue Sharks reached the quarter-finals, but was overlooked for the 2015 edition.

Career statistics

Club

International
Scores and results list Cape Verde's goal tally first, score column indicates score after each Soares goal.

Honours
Barreirense
Segunda Divisão: 2004–05

Omonia
Cypriot Super Cup: 2012

AEL Limassol
Cypriot Super Cup: 2015

References

External links

1984 births
Living people
Portuguese sportspeople of Cape Verdean descent
Sportspeople from Setúbal
Black Portuguese sportspeople
Portuguese footballers
Cape Verdean footballers
Association football midfielders
Primeira Liga players
Liga Portugal 2 players
Segunda Divisão players
F.C. Barreirense players
S.C. Olhanense players
U.D. Leiria players
C.D. Feirense players
F.C. Arouca players
Liga I players
CS Pandurii Târgu Jiu players
Cypriot First Division players
AC Omonia players
AEL Limassol players
Girabola players
C.D. Primeiro de Agosto players
Cape Verde international footballers
2013 Africa Cup of Nations players
2021 Africa Cup of Nations players
Portuguese expatriate footballers
Cape Verdean expatriate footballers
Expatriate footballers in Romania
Expatriate footballers in Cyprus
Expatriate footballers in Angola
Portuguese expatriate sportspeople in Romania
Portuguese expatriate sportspeople in Cyprus
Portuguese expatriate sportspeople in Angola
Cape Verdean expatriate sportspeople in Romania
Cape Verdean expatriate sportspeople in Cyprus
Cape Verdean expatriate sportspeople in Angola